Aileen Margaret Keel CBE FRCPath FRCPG FRCPE FRCSE FRCGP (born 12 August 1952) is a Scottish medical doctor and academic who is serving as the Director of the Innovative Healthcare Delivery Programme at the University of Edinburgh. She previously served as the Deputy Chief Medical Officer for Scotland from 1999 to 2014 and served as the Acting Chief Medical Officer, until 2015. 

Born in Glasgow, she studied medicine at the University of Glasgow Medical School. She worked in general medicine in Glasgow and Aberdeen, when she later moved to London to serve as the Director of Pathology and Consultant Haemotologist at the Cromwell Hospital. She returned to Scotland and served as the Senior Medical Officer at the Scottish Office. 

Following the establishment of Scottish devolution, Keel was appointed the Deputy CMO for Scotland in the Scottish Government and held the position until 2014, when she stood on an interim basis as the CMO. She was seconded by the Scottish Government to the University, where she is the Director of the Innovative Healthcare Delivery Programme.

Early life and education 
Keel was born in Glasgow on 12 August 1952. Her parents were Everina and Walter Keel. She studied medicine at the University of Glasgow graduating with a MB ChB in 1976.

Career 
After graduating from University, Keel trained and worked in general medicine and haematology in Glasgow Royal Infirmary, the Royal Hospital for Sick Children in Glasgow and Aberdeen Royal Infirmary. From 1987 to 1989, she was Director of Pathology and Consultant Haemotologist at Cromwell Hospital in London. She was an honorary consultant haematologist and research fellow at Central Middlesex and Middlesex Hospital from 1988 to 1992. She returned to Scotland in 1992 to take up with position of Senior Medical Office at the Scottish Office (later the Scottish Government after Scottish devolution), a post she held until her promotion in 1998 to Principal Medical Officer. She received a further promotion in 1999 to Deputy Chief Medical Officer for Scotland, and from 2014 to 2015 was Acting Chief Medical Officer for Scotland.

Since 2015, Keel has been seconded from the Scottish Government to the University of Edinburgh as the Director of the Innovative Healthcare Delivery Programme. She is Chair of the Scottish Cancer Task Force and Co-chair of COMQI (Clinical Outcomes and Measures for Quality Improvement).

Awards and honours 

 Fellow of the Royal College of Physicians of Glasgow (1992)
 Fellow of the Royal College of Pathologists (1995)
 Fellow of the Royal College of Physicians of Edinburgh (2005)
 CBE in the Birthday Honours list (2008)
 Fellow of the Royal College of Surgeons of Edinburgh (2013)
 Fellow of the Royal College of General Practitioners (2014)
 Honorary Chair, University of Edinburgh

References 

1952 births
Living people
Medical doctors from Glasgow
Alumni of the University of Glasgow
Fellows of the Royal College of Physicians of Edinburgh
Fellows of the Royal College of Physicians and Surgeons of Glasgow
Fellows of the Royal College of Pathologists
Fellows of the Royal College of General Practitioners
Scottish women medical doctors
Commanders of the Order of the British Empire
Academics of the University of Edinburgh
British haematologists
Chief Medical Officers for Scotland
Scottish women academics